International Superhits! is the first greatest hits compilation by American rock band Green Day, released November 13, 2001, through Reprise Records. It collects all of the band's singles released between 1994 and 2000 as well as a rerecording of "Maria", a B-side from Waiting, and a previously unreleased track, "Poprocks & Coke". It does not contain any material from the band's first two albums 39/Smooth or Kerplunk, because those albums were released on Lookout Records and had no hit singles. A DVD and VHS titled International Supervideos! was released simultaneously, collecting fifteen of the band's music videos spanning the same period. Both releases have been certified Platinum in the United States for sales of over 1 million copies and 2× Platinum in the United Kingdom for sales of 600,000.

Reception

Upon its release, International Superhits! charted in ten countries. The album peaked at no. 40 on the Billboard 200 in the United States and was a success in several other countries, peaking as high as no. 4 in Japan; the lowest peak in any country was in Germany at no. 67. It was certified Gold in Canada eight days after its release, for sales of over 50,000 units. It achieved Gold certification in the United States in January 2002 for sales of over 500,000, and went on to be certified Platinum in 2005 for sales of over 1 million. Also in 2005 it reached no. 1 on Billboard's Catalog Albums chart. It has also been certified 2× Platinum in the United Kingdom for sales of 852,000, and Triple Platinum in Australia for sales of over 210,000, bringing its worldwide sales to over 2,062,000.

Critic Stephen Thomas Erlewine gave the album a perfect five-star review, saying it "confirms that Green Day not only were popular and good, but they could have held their own against their idols" and that "distilled to their singles, Green Day sound fiercer than ever, and more musically vibrant". Sal Cinquemani of Slant Magazine rated it four stars out of five, remarking that "Time-tested hits like 'Basket Case', 'Brain Stew', and 'Hitchin' a Ride', along with soundtrack contributions 'J.A.R.' and 'Nice Guys Finish Last', heartily display Green Day's remarkable longevity. The album's new offering, 'Poprocks & Coke', dishes out more of the maturated, acoustic-filled folk-punk that began with 'Good Riddance (Time of Your Life)' and Warning ... The collection's only flaw is the omission of tracks representing the band's pre-fame days."

Track listing

Personnel
Green Day
Billie Joe Armstrong – lead vocals, guitar, producer
Mike Dirnt – bass guitar, backing vocals, producer
Tré Cool – drums, producer

Production
Jerry Finn – producer, mix engineer
Rob Cavallo – producer
Joe McGrath – recording engineer
Chris Bilheimer – art direction
Marina Chavez – photography

Charts

Weekly charts

Year-end charts

Certifications

International Supervideos!

Released the same day as International Superhits!, the International Supervideos! DVD and VHS collects fifteen of Green Day's music videos from 1994 to 2001. It does not include the video for "Welcome to Paradise" from this period. A video for Green Day's instrumental song, “Last Ride In” is also included. To promote International Superhits! a video was filmed for the song "Macy's Day Parade", though it is not included on the DVD or VHS. International Supervideos! was certified Platinum in 2008 by the Recording Industry Association of America for sales of over 100,000 units.

Track listing

Certifications

References

Green Day compilation albums
2001 greatest hits albums
Albums produced by Jerry Finn
Albums produced by Rob Cavallo
Reprise Records compilation albums